Regional elections were held in Denmark in March 1917. 10166 municipal council members were elected.

References

1917
Denmark
Elections
March 1917 events